Jack Green may refer to:

Sportsmen
Jack Green (cricketer) (1921–2005), Australian cricketer
Jack Green (footballer, born 1887) (1887–1963), Australian rules footballer for Geelong and Collingwood
Jack Green (footballer, born 1905) (1905–1960), Australian rules footballer for Carlton and Hawthorn
Jack Green (footballer, born 1919) (1919–1981), Australian rules footballer for Collingwood
Jack Green (footballer, born 1947), Australian rules footballer for Collingwood
John Green (guard) (1924–1981), American football player and coach known as "Jack"
Jack Green (hurdler) (born 1991), British 400 m hurdler
Jack Green (soccer) (died 1960), English-Canadian soccer inside forward

Others
Jack Green (critic) (born 1928), author of Fire the Bastards!, a defense of William Gaddis's The Recognitions
Jack Green (geologist) (1925–2014), geologist and geology professor
Jack Green (karateka), former British karate champion
Jack Green (musician) (born 1951), Scottish musician
Jack N. Green (born 1946), American cinematographer

See also
Jack Greene (1930–2013), American country musician
Jack P. Greene (born 1931), American historian
John Green (disambiguation)
Jake Green (disambiguation)
Jack in the green, a participant in traditional English May Day parades
Jackgreen, Australian green energy company

Green, Jack